General Sir William Gordon Cameron  (Chinese translated Name: 金馬倫; 16 October 1827 – 2 March 1913) was a British soldier and colonial administrator.

Military career
William Gordon Cameron was commissioned into the 42nd (Royal Highland) Regiment of Foot in 1844. He transferred to the Grenadier Guards in 1847. In 1854 he was deployed to the Crimean War and took part in the Battle of Alma. He was appointed Commanding Officer of 3rd Regiment of the British German Legion in 1855.

In 1867 he became Commanding Officer of 1st Battalion 4th King's Own Royal Regiment and led the capture of Magdala during the British Expedition to Abyssinia.

In 1875, he became commander of a brigade at Gibraltar and in 1875 of a brigade at Aldershot. In April 1881 he was appointed General Officer Commanding Northern District. Then in 1884 he became Commander of British Troops in China, Hong Kong and the Straits Settlements. He governed Hong Kong in a period between April 1887 to October 1887.

He was appointed Honorary Colonel of the 5th (West Middlesex) Middlesex Rifle Volunteer Corps in 1880.

From January 1891 to December 1892 and then again in May to July 1894 he was Administrator of the Cape Colony. He retired in 1895.

Family
General Sir William Gordon Cameron was the son of Lieutenant-Colonel William Gordon Cameron J.P. (1790–1856) and his wife Caroline née Edwards (1801–1872), and the elder brother of Colonel Aylmer Cameron VC, who won the Victoria Cross in 1858 during the Indian Mutiny.

He married Helen Colebrooke Mary, daughter of General Sir John Hunter Littler, GCB on 20 January 1857 in the Church of the Holy Trinity, Buckfastleigh, Devon, England.

Memory
Several places in Hong Kong were named after Cameron: Cameron Road and Cameron Lane in Tsim Sha Tsui, Kowloon, as well as Mount Cameron and Mount Cameron Road.

References

 

|-

|-

1827 births
1913 deaths
Governors of Hong Kong
Commanders of Hong Kong
British Army generals
Knights Grand Cross of the Order of the Bath
42nd Regiment of Foot officers
Grenadier Guards officers
British Army personnel of the Crimean War
British military personnel of the Abyssinian War